Karoonda is a town in the middle of the Murray Mallee region of South Australia ( northeast of Murray Bridge). The current boundaries include the former town of Lowaldie, which was the next stop on the railway line away from Adelaide.

At the 2016 census, the locality of Karoonda had a population of 512, of whom 351 were living in and around the town of Karoonda.

History
Karoonda takes its name from the Aboriginal word for "winter camp".

The town was founded on wheat-growing early in the 20th century (proclaimed on 11 December 1913), but the cleared land is also suitable for raising merino sheep. The Karoonda Development Group instigated and built a larger-than-life sculpture of a Merino ram in the park in the main street to emphasise this. There are even seats with rams heads dotted around the town. A number of other agricultural and horticultural industries are now also represented in the district. Each year the Karoonda Farm Fair is held, a two-day event attracting over 10,000 visitors to the town.

In 1922 the District Council of Karoonda was established, bringing local-level government to the township and surrounding district for the first time.

Karoonda briefly shot to international fame in 1930 when the "Karoonda meteorite" fell to earth just to the east of the town on the night of 25 November. Being of a very rare type and being found only a couple of weeks afterwards, it raised international interest in astronomical circles.

Railways
Railways were built in 1911–1914 to open up the mallee. Karoonda was on the Brown's Well railway line (extended to Barmera in 1928) and became a junction with the Waikerie railway line to the north and the Peebinga railway line to the east (south of the main line).

Both branches were closed in 1990, but the main line through Karoonda remained open until 2015 as the Loxton railway line and was converted from broad gauge to standard gauge.

Governance and demographics
Karoonda is located in the local government area of District Council of Karoonda East Murray, the state electoral district of Hammond and the federal Division of Barker.

At the 2016 census, the locality of Karoonda had a population of 512, of which 351 were living in and around the town of Karoonda. In Karoonda locality 90.6% of people were born in Australia and 93.3% of people spoke only English at home. The most common responses for religion were Uniting Church 25.0% and No Religion 22.4%.

Facilities and attractions

Karoonda Area School was the first area school in South Australia.

Pioneer Park on East Terrace is being developed as a Malleelands Pioneer Railways and farm museum, with displays of harvest machinery, ploughs, railway rolling stock and facilities already in place. The Nature Trail & Bush Walk is adjacent.

There is an obelisk to commemorate the Karoonda meteorite in the RSL Park on Railway Terrace.

Climate
Karoonda experiences a cold semi-arid climate (Köppen climate classification: BSk), Trewartha: BSal); with warm, dry summers; mild, relatively dry springs and autumns; and mild, relatively dry winters.

Lowaldie
These have all closed, and the former institute building is used as a private residence. The station was originally named Lowalde in 1913, but when the town was proclaimed in 1914, the spelling used was Lowaldie. The name is derived from a Ngarrindjeri word meaning "summer".

Photo gallery

References

Towns in South Australia